Moerckia hibernica (vernacular name: Irish ruffwort) is a species of liverwort belonging to the family Moerckiaceae.

It is native to the Northern Hemisphere.

References

Pallaviciniales